Pasco School District # 1 serves over 19,000 school children from the City of Pasco, Washington and unincorporated Franklin County. It operates 17 elementary schools, four middle schools, four high schools, and four digital learning platforms. 

We proudly serves a diverse population of students and families, with over 70% of students identifying as Hispanic. Programs offered by PSD include a Dual Language program serving over 1,600 students, special education services serving over 2,400 students, and highly capable services serving over 2,300 students.

The school district's Superintendent, Michelle Whitney, has been serving since 2016.

Schools in Pasco, WA School District # 1

Elementary schools

Captain Gray STEM Elementary School
Columbia River Elementary School
Edwin Markham Elementary School
 Emerson Elementary School
 Franklin STEM Elementary School
James McGee Elementary School
Longfellow Elementary School
Marie Curie STEM Elementary School
Mark Twain Elementary School
Maya Angelou Elementary School
Barbara McClintock STEM Elementary School
 Robert Frost Elementary School
 Rowena Chess Elementary School
 Ruth Livingston Elementary School
Three Rivers Elementary School
Virgie Robinson Elementary School
 Whittier Elementary School

Middle schools

 McLoughlin Middle School
 Stevens Middle School
 Ochoa Middle School
Reynolds Middle School

High schools
 Chiawana High School
 Delta High School (in partnership with the Kennewick and Richland School Districts)
 New Horizons Alternative High School
 Pasco High School

Stadium

 Edgar Brown Memorial Stadium

External links
 Pasco School District
 Pasco School district WASL scores

School districts in Washington (state)
Pasco, Washington
Education in Franklin County, Washington